Heydarabad-e Sofla (also Romanized as Ḩeydarābād-e Soflá; also known as Ḩeydarābād) is a village in Ludab Rural District, Ludab District, Boyer-Ahmad County, Kohgiluyeh and Boyer-Ahmad Province, Iran. At the 2006 census, its population was 426, in 97 families.

References 

Populated places in Boyer-Ahmad County